Tunney's Pasture is the western O-Train light rail terminal train station in Ottawa, Ontario.

Location
It is located at the Tunney's Pasture government office complex, on Scott Street at Holland Avenue.

History
When originally opened in 1983, the transitway in the area consisted of a through station in a below-grade 'trench' parallel to Scott Street. Each platform had an elevator and stairway to the ground level above; the two sides were connected by an enclosed pedestrian bridge, and the ground-level station area also has platforms for local buses.

On 10 May 2003, an arson at the station inflicted damage estimated at $400,000 to $500,000 CAD. The fire left portions of the station out of service for months.

On June 24, 2016, the transitway station was closed for conversion to light rail, and reopened in 2019 as the western terminus of the first phase of the Confederation Line. There are provisions to permit the Confederation Line to extend further west along the transitway in the next stage.

Layout
The station is a side platform station built below grade in a cutting. At street level, a broad concourse with two ticket barriers gives access to Scott Street and Tunney's Pasture Driveway. It also provides access within the fare-paid zone to the transitway terminal loop, allowing transfer between the bus and train without having to show a ticket or transfer.

As a terminus station, both platforms are used as arrival and departure platforms. Because of the station's side platform rather than island platform layout, displays on the concourse level are necessary to indicate which platform will next have a train departing.

The station features the artwork Gradient Space by Derek Root, a set of coloured mosaics lining the platform walls accompanied by a stained-glass skylight.

Service

The following routes serve Tunney's Pasture station as of October 6, 2019:

Gallery

References

External links

OC Transpo station page
OC Transpo area map with location of main buildings of Tunney's Pasture

Buildings and structures in Canada destroyed by arson
Confederation Line stations
1983 establishments in Ontario
2019 establishments in Ontario
Railway stations in Canada opened in 2019
Transitway (Ottawa) stations